James McLachlan Sr. (16 July 1842 – 5 October 1904) was an Australian politician who represented the South Australian House of Assembly multi-member seat of Wooroora from 1893 to 1902. He represented the National Defence League in 1893 and 1896.

References

Members of the South Australian House of Assembly
1842 births
1904 deaths